Marvel Legends is an action figure line based on the characters of Marvel Comics, initially produced by Toy Biz, then by Hasbro. After Hasbro gained the rights to produce Marvel toys, the company continued with the theme of Build-A-Figure pieces. Also, Hasbro's new molds mostly eliminated finger joints, a mainstay of the Toy Biz era, and the comic book pack-ins.

 All the figures in the Terrax and Arnim Zola waves were labelled with a "The Return of Marvel Legends" sticker.
 The Hit-Monkey, Rocket Raccoon, and Jubilee waves used the "Mini" Build-A-Figure concept.

Figures

80th Anniversary Box Sets

Epic Heroes (2013)
This is the second series that does not include a Build-A-Figure since figures began to ship with Build-A-Figure pieces. Instead, each figure came with a display base, just like in the early series of Marvel Legends, though these bases included much less detail were identical.

Marvel Retro
The Vintage series mostly consists or retooled or repainted figures featuring older designs and packaging inspired by ToyBiz's Marvel Super Heroes and X-Men lines from the 1990s, as well as the action figures from cartoons like Spider-Man: The Animated Series, Fantastic Four: The Animated Series and Iron Man: The Animated Series. However, some of the figures in the line are indeed new.

Fan Channel exclusive Retro figures

Deluxe
Figures at a higher price point that are larger or come with additional accessories.

Single releases
Figures released without a Build-a-Figure piece that are not included in waves or as retail exclusives.

Ultimate Riders
A series of figures that come packaged with vehicles, similar to the ToyBiz Legendary Riders wave.

Best of Marvel Legends
An annual series U.K./Australia-exclusive waves that solely repackage figures and BAFs based on characters from the Marvel Cinematic Universe.

2 Packs

Box Sets

Marvel Studios: The First Ten Years (2018)

80th Anniversary

Hasbro products
2000s toys
2010s toys
Marvel Comics action figure lines